Vrede is a town in the Free State province of South Africa that is the agricultural hub of a 100 km² region. Maize, wheat, mutton, wool, beef, dairy products and poultry are farmed in the region.

History
In 1863 one J. H. Krynauw bought the farm, aptly named "Krynauwslust" located where the town of Vrede was later proclaimed in 1879. The town celebrated its centenary in 1979.

The town's Afrikaans name "Vrede" can be directly translated to "Peace" in English. This name resulted, due to a bitter feud that raged between the early settlers of the area where the town initially should have been placed. A compromise was reached and peace among the early citizens was achieved, hence the name, "Vrede".

The names Leeukop (Lionshead), Tygerspoort (Tiger's Passage), Kwaggaspoort (Zebra's Passage) still exist today. Unfortunately the folk of the earlier years were not conscious of the ecology and now only names of the game that roamed the area remain. The last known free roaming lion in the area was shot in 1865. In 1858 a sole hippo was spotted in the wetlands surrounding the district of Memel, the neighboring town.

Between 1899 and 1902 many famous battles were fought in and around Vrede and Vrede was also the setting of the stand of the Great Rebellion of 1914 when citizens were called to arms in aid of Britain in the First World War against Germany.

Notable people 
 André Brink (1935–2015), novelist, born in Vrede but moving to Lydenburg in childhood
 Sid Kiel (1916–2007), doctor, athlete, and cricketer, born on a Vrede sheep farm but moving to Cape Town in childhood
 Mosebenzi Zwane, former Minister of Mineral Resources
 Bheki Radebe (1965-), Member of the National Assembly (Parliament), born and raised in Vrede. One of the township sections is named after him. 
 Ruben Kruger (1970-2010), Springbok Rugby player, who was part of team who won the Rugby World Cup in 1995. His family still farms in the area. 
 David Louw (1987-), actor, known for Villa Rosa and Getroud met Rugby.
 Piet van Zyl (1989-), Springbok Rugby player, now Stade Français Paris Rugby, was born in Vrede, but went to Grey College at age 14.

References

External links 

Populated places in the Phumelela Local Municipality
Populated places established in 1876
1876 establishments in the Orange Free State